Dareveyan (also Romanized as Dareveyān; also known as Dalvīān, Darreh Vīān, and Darreh-ye Īvān) is a village in Saral Rural District, Saral District, Divandarreh County, Kurdistan Province, Iran. At the 2006 census, its population was 69, in 12 families. The village is populated by Kurds.

References 

Towns and villages in Divandarreh County
Kurdish settlements in Kurdistan Province